The PIT maneuver (Pursuit Intervention Technique (https://pars.lasd.org/Viewer/Manuals/10008/Content/15528) or TVI (tactical vehicle intervention) is a pursuit tactic by which a pursuing car can force a fleeing car to turn sideways abruptly, causing the driver to lose control and stop.  It was developed by driver training company BSR Inc. and first used by the Fairfax County Police Department of Virginia, United States. Other interpretations of the acronym "PIT" include pursuit immobilization technique, pursuit intervention technique, parallel immobilization technique, and precision intervention tactic.  The technique is also known as tactical ramming, legal intervention, and fishtailing. 

The technique is used by law enforcement officers to bring car chases to a conclusion. Other methods of stopping a fugitive vehicle include the use of spike strips, or the use of tactical pursuit and containment (see below).

History

The PIT maneuver was adapted from the bump and run technique used in stock car racing, where a driver would bump a competitor in the rear bumper to cause the other car to lose traction and swerve away from the racing line.  The PIT maneuver differs from the bump and run in that the car is bumped from the side near a rear wheel, causing the vehicle in front to spin out.  It is illegal to perform this maneuver intentionally in stock car racing because it is very dangerous.  The high speed involved in auto racing makes it much easier for drivers to take out another car with a less substantial bump than at lower speeds.  When employing the PIT maneuver, the speed of the two cars involved will determine how far the car will travel once it is bumped.  Partially for this reason, the higher the speed, the more unpredictable and dangerous the PIT maneuver becomes.  This is just one of the very important factors a police officer must consider before implementing the PIT maneuver.

Police departments throughout the United States consider the PIT maneuver as an intermediate force option that can safely end a pursuit. Police vehicles often have reinforced front bumpers to support this technique.

Procedure 
The PIT begins when the pursuing vehicle pulls alongside the fleeing vehicle so that the portion of the pursuer's vehicle forward of the front wheels is aligned with the portion of the target vehicle behind the back wheels. The pursuer gently makes contact with the target's side, then steers sharply into the target. The pursuer must also accelerate or its bumper will slide off the target vehicle. As soon as the fleeing vehicle's rear tires lose traction and start to skid, the pursuer continues to turn in the same direction until clear of the target. This is more of a committed lane change than an actual turn. The target will turn in the opposite direction, in front of the pursuer, and will spin out. The PIT may be done from either side, but consideration must be given to where both cars will end up. Typically, another police car will tail the PIT unit to proceed with the arrest, while the PIT unit recovers its own control and completely stops the car. The PIT does not immobilize the suspect vehicle and to prevent further flight, two police cars need to pin the suspect between them, front and rear.

Avoidance maneuvers

While steering into the skid (away from the pursuing vehicle) will reduce its effect, the fact that the pursuing car is continuing to push the rear of the target sideways virtually ensures loss of control of the targeted vehicle. By moving forward out of position, or by staying squarely in front of the PIT unit, the lead vehicle can disallow the PIT unit from gaining proper positioning to conduct the maneuver. Alternatively, rapid deceleration will, of course, force the PIT unit to overshoot the required positioning.

Limitations 

The PIT is not applicable in every situation, and many factors affect the usefulness of the technique. Because of the police department's potential liability for the injury or death of not only of the occupants of the target vehicle, but also bystanders, most departments limit its use to only the most high-risk scenarios. Most departments specify that the PIT should only be used to stop pursuits that are immediately dangerous and ongoing. When possible, a minimum of three pursuers should be present when a PIT is executed: one as the PIT vehicle and two following at a greater distance to react to the results.

The PIT is especially hazardous when the vehicles' bumpers are of significantly different heights, or against target vehicles with a high center of gravity such as vans or SUVs. High center of gravity vehicles frequently roll over. It cannot be safely used on motorcycles at any speed.

At speeds below 35 MPH, the PIT maneuver can be used on a fleeing vehicle, if the legal parameters would justify "less than lethal force" against the driver. At speeds greater than 35 MPH, the technique still works, but given that kinetic energy (the key injury-severity determinant) increases with speed squared, the PIT maneuver is considered potentially lethal and normally would only be used if lethal force is justified against all occupants (and when no risk to bystanders nor other vehicles is foreseeable). The tactic is best used when the driver is on surface streets and cornering. The aforementioned reality that kinetic energy quadruples with every doubling in speed (and increases nine-fold when speed is tripled) also means that a high-speed motorist who is allowed to escape could kill innocent people.  With this in mind, the PIT maneuver can sometimes be justified for a traffic offense. However, because unwilling or innocent passengers may be present in the car, there is an inherent difficulty in justifying the use of PITs.
  
Some people suggest that due to the electronic control systems on many modern vehicles, the policies of using PIT maneuvers might need to be reconsidered.

TPAC 
Tactical Pursuit And Containment (TPAC) is a term used by police in the United Kingdom, and describes training for managing and terminating police pursuits. TPAC embodies several methods of stopping fleeing vehicles, including rolling roadblocks, use of spike strips, and the "box and stop" containment method. TPAC is most effective on separated carriageways (such as motorways) where the path of the suspect is limited. It is not suited to roads with frequent cross-roads, those with two-way traffic on a single carriageway, or highways where the suspect may escape by means of a U-turn across the median strip.

Once a fleeing driver is contained on a motorway, a rolling block is initiated ahead of the pursuit. When the pursuit reaches the slowed traffic, the suspect can either attempt to pass the traffic or stay behind it. If the suspect chooses to stay behind the traffic, communication between the pursuing vehicles and the blocking vehicle(s) will lead to the block coming to a standstill, and the vehicle is surrounded and occupants detained. If the fleeing driver chooses to pass the traffic, usually on the hard shoulder, the pursuing vehicles follow it. Once past the traffic, the police vehicles can box in the suspect's vehicle and bring it to a controlled stop through coordinated braking, utilizing the sterile area in front of the blocking vehicle(s) to do so without endangering other road users.

In the UK, TPAC is specialist training given to advanced police drivers. As with the PIT technique, consideration has to be given to the size, weight and center of gravity of the fleeing vehicle.

British police are comfortable with the TPAC, as fleeing drivers are usually considered to be unarmed, and driving beside or in front of them is not a hazard. Police in the US assume the driver is armed and prefer the PIT maneuver, as it is done from behind the suspect vehicle.

The typical PIT, seen in North America, can be utilized by trained police officers in the UK, typically on roads policing or armed response units. Rather than being referred to as a PIT, it simply forms part of 'tactical contact'.

References

External links 
 "California police use special tactic to end car chase"—BBC News
 "What Is a PIT Maneuver? Nicole Harper Incident Throws Spotlight on Police Tactic"—Newsweek

Driving
Law enforcement techniques